José García Ramos (1852, Seville - 2 April 1912, Seville) was a Spanish painter and illustrator; known primarily for his costumbrista scenes.

Biography 
He attended the "Escuela Provincial de Bellas Artes de Sevilla" at the age of nine, where he studied with Eduardo Cano, then completed his artistic education in the workshop of José Jiménez Aranda, with whom he travelled to Rome in 1872. There, he earned his living painting small landscapes and portraits of visiting Andalusians, for which he was especially noted. He also became acquainted with Mariano Fortuny, who had a great influence on his style. 

In 1877, he visited Naples and Venice and, in 1882, returned to Spain with a brief side trip to Paris. Later, he was named a Professor at the "Escuela de Artes Industriales" and an Academician at the Real Academia de Bellas Artes de Santa Isabel de Hungría. He also worked as an illustrator for several publications; notably , La Ilustración Española y Americana and Blanco y Negro. He won third prize at the Exposition Universelle (1900). 

His favorite themes were traditional in nature and he is considered a major exponent of Andalusian regional painting. The government accepted the proposal, it was paid for with funds collected by the artists, and was opened to the public in 1923.

Many of his best known works may be seen at the Carmen Thyssen Museum in Málaga and at the Museo del Prado.

Selected paintings

References

Further reading 
 Enrique Valdivieso: Historia de la pintura sevillana, 1992. Guadalquivir S.L.. Ediciones. .

External links 

 More works by García @ ArtNet
 Biography and works @ the Museo del Prado
 Biography @ MCN Biografías

1852 births
1912 deaths
Spanish painters
Spanish genre painters
Spanish illustrators
Painters from Seville